The Royal Horticultural Society of Ireland (RHSI), founded in 1816, is the Ireland's leading gardening charity.

History
The RHSI was founded as a charity in 1816 promoting and educating on all aspects of gardening in Ireland. The inaugural meeting took place on 30 September 1816 at the Rose Tavern, Donnybrook, Dublin as a Horticultural Society of Ireland with the Earl of Charlemont as its patron and Francis Hetherington as its chairman. The new society held its first flower show on Easter Monday 1817, and flower and fruit show on 18 August 1817. After a number of shows in the intervening years, the society declined, and was re-established with a new committee in 1830. By 1848 the Society became known as the Royal Horticultural Society of Ireland.

Its membership is made up of both professional and amateur gardeners. In 2016, the RHSI celebrated its 200 anniversary.

References

Gardening in the Republic of Ireland
Organizations established in 1816
1816 establishments in Ireland